Who Done It? is a 1949 short subject directed by Edward Bernds starring American slapstick comedy team The Three Stooges (Moe Howard, Larry Fine and Shemp Howard). It is the 114th entry in the series released by Columbia Pictures starring the comedians, who released 190 shorts for the studio between 1934 and 1959.

Plot
The Stooges are private eyes at the Alert Detective Agency who are called upon by the wealthy Mr. Goodrich (Emil Sitka). Goodrich reports that the evil Phantom Gang, of which his own niece (Christine McIntyre) is a member, has been murdering socialites and rich people, with Goodrich as their next target. By the time the Stooges arrive, Goodrich is out cold and locked away, with the butler (Charles Knight) (also a member of the Phantom Gang) greeting the trio. Goodrich's niece flirts with Shemp, ultimately trying to poison him. Finally, a towering goon named Nikko (Duke York) chases the Stooges from room to room. After Shemp knocks Nikko cold, he literally bumps into an unconscious Goodrich, who spills the Phantom Gang's plot. A fight then ensues with the lights out, and the Stooges ultimately get the baddies. And occasionally Shemp knocks out Moe, Mr. Goodrich, Larry and himself at the end after he successfully knocks out the evil Phantom gang with his fireplace shovel.

Cast

Credited

Production notes
Who Done It? was filmed on December 9–12, 1947, and released 15 months later on March 3, 1949. It was remade as For Crimin' Out Loud, the penultimate entry filmed featuring Shemp prior to his death in November 1955; it was released posthumously in May 1956.

Who Done It? marks the final appearance of longtime co-star Duke York, who shortly died from suicide on January 24, 1952.

Development
Director Edward Bernds had completed the script for Who Done It?  in 1946 and was ready to shoot the film after Half-Wits Holiday, Curly Howard's last starring film with the Stooges. Howard's untimely stroke rendered him unable to continue with the act, so Bernds jettisoned his original script and hastily rewrote it for Columbia Pictures comics Gus Schilling and Richard Lane. Schilling's part was written as a combined Curly/Larry role, while Lane's was as Moe. Schilling & Lane's version of Who Done It? was called Pardon My Terror, which also included Emil Sitka, Dudley Dickerson and Christine McIntyre in its cast.

Bernds later admitted that the rewritten script was not a good fit for Schilling & Lane and was determined to have the Stooges film Who Done It?. He took his original script, substituted several lines meant for Curly with lines fitted for Shemp's brand of comedy. Stooge expert Jon Solomon, author of The Complete Three Stooges: The Official Filmography and Three Stooges Companion commented that "this well-balanced mixture of physical abuse, verbal banter, and emotional surprise is particularly vibrant even for a Stooge film." He added that "the scene in which...Christine McIntyre and Shemp point out their favorite painting while switching the drugged drink elegantly builds to a climax unparalleled in all of Stoogedom with forty seconds of Shemp wheezing, 't-k'ing, meeping, shuttering, flipping, flopping, chicken-with-its-head-cut-off-ing, and then slamming his legs on the ground in near rigor mortis."

Injury
On the last day of production, while shooting the scene in which the Stooges crash through a door, Moe sprained his ankle. Since production could not be delayed, he taped it up and kept going. During the scenes filmed in the hallway, he is noticeably limping.

References

External links 

Who Done It? at threestooges.net

1949 films
The Three Stooges films
American black-and-white films
1940s comedy mystery films
American comedy mystery films
American comedy thriller films
Films directed by Edward Bernds
Columbia Pictures short films
1940s comedy thriller films
1949 comedy films
1940s English-language films
1940s American films